This is a list of schools in Dongcheng District, Beijing.

Secondary schools
Note: In China the word 中学 zhōngxué, literally translated as "middle school", refers to any secondary school and differs from the American usage of the term "middle school" to mean specifically a lower secondary school or junior high school. 初中 chū​zhōng is used to refer to a lower secondary school.

 Beijing Huiwen Middle School (formerly known in English as Peking Academy)
 Beijing Huiwen Experimental School - 125 High School (北京汇文实验中学（125中学）)
 Beijing Jingshan School - Main Campus and Dengshikou Campus (灯市口校区)
 Beijing City No. 2 School Branch School (北京市第二中学分校)
  (北京市第一中学)
  (北京市第二中学)
 Beijing No. 5 High School
 Beijing No. 5 High School Branch School (北京市第五中学分校) - Dianmen Campus (地安门校区) and Gulou Campus (鼓楼校区)
  (北京市第十一中学) - Main school and branch school (分校)
 Beijing No. 11 High School Experimental School (北京市第十一中学实验学校)
 Beijing City No. 21 High School (北京市第二十一中学)
  (北京市第二十二中学) - Andingmen Campus (安定门校区) and Jiaodaokou Campus (交道口校区)
 Beijing City No. 24 High School (北京市第二十四中学)
 Beijing No. 25 Middle School
 Beijing City No. 27 High School (北京市第二十七中学)
  (北京市第五十中学) - Main School and Branch School (分校)
 Beijing City No. 54 High School (北京市第五十四中学) - Main School and Branch School (分校)
  (北京市第五十五中学)
 Beijing City No. 65 High School (北京市第六十五中学)
 Beijing City No. 96 High School (北京市第九十六中学) - Main campus and South Campus (南校区)
 Beijing City No. 109 High School (北京市第一零九中学)
 Beijing City No. 115 High School (北京市第一一五中学)
 Beijing City No. 142 High School (北京市第一四二中学) - Beijing Hongzhi High School (北京宏志中学)
 Beijing City No. 165 High School (北京市第一六五中学)
 Beijing City No. 166 High School - Dengshikou Campus (灯市口校区) and Dongsiliutiao Campus (东四六条校区)
  (北京市第一七一中学) - East Campus (东校区) and West Campus (西校区) 
 Beijing City Chongwenmen High School (北京市崇文门中学)
  (北京市东直门中学) - In Dongzhimen
  (北京市广渠门中学) - Main Campus and South Campus (南校区)
 Beijing City Heping Road School (北京市和平北路学校) - Beijing City Dongcheng Sports School (北京市东城体育学校)
 Beijing City Guozijian High School (北京市国子监中学)
 Beijing City Longtan High School (北京市龙潭中学)
 Beijing City Qianmen Foreign Language School (北京市前门外国语学校)
 Beijing City Wenhui High School (北京市文汇中学)
  Affiliated High School (中央工艺美术学院附属中学) - Beijing City International Arts Campus (北京市国际美术学校) 
 Dongcheng District Peizhi Zhongxin School (东城区培智中心学校)
 Beijing City Dongcheng District Special Education School (北京市东城区特殊教育学校)

Primary schools

 Beijing City No. 5 High School Affiliated Fangjia Hutong Primary School (北京市第五中学分校附属方家胡同小学)
 Beijing City No. 166 High School Affiliated Xiaowei Hutong Primary School (北京市第一六六中学附属校尉胡同小学)
 Beijing City No. 171 High School Affiliated Qingnianhu Primary School (北京市第一七一中学附属青年湖小学)
 Beijing City Dongzhimen High School Affiliated Yonghe Temple Primary School (北京市东直门中学附属雍和宫小学)
 Beijing City Guangqumen High School Affiliated Huashi Primary School (北京市广渠门中学附属花市小学)
 Beijing City Dongcheng District Wenhui Primary School (北京市东城区文汇小学)

References

 
Dongcheng